Ameer Muhammad Khan is a Pakistani politician who was a Member of the Provincial Assembly of the Punjab, from May 2013 to May 2018 and from August 2018 to January 2023.

Early life and education
He was born on 17 November 1972 in Bhakkar.

He graduated in 1994 from University of the Punjab and has a degree of Bachelor of Arts.

Political career
He was elected to the Provincial Assembly of the Punjab as an independent candidate from Constituency PP-47 (Bhakkar-I) in 2013 Pakistani general election. He joined Pakistan Muslim League (N) in May 2013.

He was re-elected to the Provincial Assembly of the Punjab as an independent candidate from Constituency PP-89 (Bhakkar-I) in 2018 Pakistani general election.

He joined Pakistan Tehreek-e-Insaf (PTI) following his election.

On 11 September 2018, he was inducted into the provincial Punjab cabinet of Chief Minister Usman Buzdar and was appointed as special assistant to the Chief Minister on forest.

References

Living people
Punjab MPAs 2013–2018
1972 births
Pakistan Muslim League (N) politicians
University of the Punjab alumni
People from Bhakkar District
Punjab MPAs 2018–2023
Pakistan Tehreek-e-Insaf MPAs (Punjab)